Louise Erickson may refer to:
 Louise Erickson (baseball) (1929–2016), American pitcher
 Louise Erickson (actress) (1928–2019), American actress
 Louise Eriksen (born 1995), Danish footballer